The Kerava–Lahti railway line or Lahden oikorata (Lahti direct line) is a railway line in southern Finland between the towns of Kerava and Lahti, which opened on 3 September 2006.

History
In 1990, the Ministry of Transport commissioned a study regarding the construction of a new line connecting Helsinki with eastern Finland, prompted by the capacity problems of the Helsinki–Riihimäki railway. Three main routes for the new connection were proposed: Helsinki–Lahti–Mikkeli, Helsinki–Kouvola, and Helsinki–Kotka–Hamina–Luumäki. All three options were deemed superior to the alternative of simply upgrading the existing lines. The Kotka option was found to be the least economically viable of the three, while those of Lahti and Kouvola were found to be about equal in this respect. The study was completed in 1992, favoring the Lahti option.

The construction of the Kerava–Lahti railway line took four years and cost €331 million. At the time it was the first new passenger railway to be opened in Finland since completion of the Jämsänkoski–Jyväskylä line in 1977, reducing the journey time between Kerava and Lahti by 26 kilometres. Funding was provided by the Finnish government and the European Union, with the route forming part of the EU's "Nordic Triangle" TEN-T strategic transport route.

Services
The line is used as a shortcut for services from Helsinki to eastern Finnish cities including Kouvola, Kuopio and Joensuu, which all used the line to Riihimäki prior to the construction of the Kerava–Lahti line. The Z train of the Helsinki commuter rail also uses the line.

Future
Proposals exist to build a similar direct railway line from Helsinki Central to Kouvola via Helsinki Airport and Porvoo (known as Itärata), which would handle traffic to eastern Finnish cities such as Kuopio, Joensuu, Lappeenranta and Mikkeli, providing a shorter journey time between Helsinki and these cities than currently offered by the Kerava-Lahti line.

Stations
 Haarajoki
 Mäntsälä
 Henna

See also
 Helsinki commuter rail
 List of railway lines in Finland
 Rail transport in Finland

References

Railway lines in Finland
5 ft gauge railways in Finland
Railway lines opened in 2006
2006 establishments in Finland
Buildings and structures completed in 2006